Edmund Wodehouse (26 July 1784 – 21 August 1855), was a British politician.

Background
Wodehouse was the son of Thomas Wodehouse, younger son of Sir Armine Wodehouse, 5th Baronet and brother of John Wodehouse, 1st Baron Wodehouse. His mother was Sarah, daughter of Pryse Campbell.

Political career
Wodehouse entered Parliament as one of two representatives for Norfolk in 1817, a seat he held until 1830. Between 1835 and 1855 he was a Tory Member of Parliament (MP) for Norfolk East.

Family
Wodehouse married his first cousin, Lucy, daughter of Reverend Philip Wodehouse, in 1809. They had several children, including Sir Philip Wodehouse and General Edmund Wodehouse. She died in June 1829. Wodehouse remained a widower until his death in August 1855, aged 76.

See also
Earl of Kimberley

References

External links
 
  1835 - 1855
 (as Edmund Wodehouse; marker correct)

1784 births
1855 deaths
Members of Parliament for Norfolk
UK MPs 1812–1818
UK MPs 1818–1820
UK MPs 1820–1826
UK MPs 1826–1830
UK MPs 1835–1837
UK MPs 1837–1841
UK MPs 1841–1847
UK MPs 1847–1852
UK MPs 1852–1857
Edmond Wodehouse